This is a list of the families, species and subspecies of the order Procellariiformes.

Conservation status - IUCN Red List of Threatened Species:
 - Extinct,  - Extinct in the wild
 - Critically endangered,  - Endangered,  - Vulnerable
 - Near threatened,  - Least concern
 - Data deficient,  - Not evaluated
(v. 2021-3, the data is current as of February 25, 2022)

Albatrosses
Order: ProcellariiformesFamily: Diomedeidae

The albatrosses are a family of 21 species of large seabird found across the Southern and North Pacific Oceans. The largest are among the largest flying birds in the world.

Laysan albatross, Phoebastria immutabilis 
Black-footed albatross, Phoebastria nigripes 
Waved albatross, Phoebastria irrorata 
Short-tailed albatross, Phoebastria albatrus 

Wandering albatross, Diomedea exulans 
Antipodean albatross, Diomedea antipodensis 
Amsterdam albatross, Diomedea amsterdamensis 
Southern royal albatross, Diomedea epomophora 
Northern royal albatross, Diomedea sanfordi 
Tristan albatross, Diomedea dabbenena 
Sooty albatross, Phoebetria fusca 
Light-mantled albatross, Phoebetria palpebrata 
Black-browed albatross, Thalassarche melanophris 
Campbell albatross, Thalassarche impavida 
Shy albatross, Thalassarche cauta 
Chatham albatross, Thalassarche eremita 
Salvin's albatross, Thalassarche salvini 
Grey-headed albatross, Thalassarche chrysostoma 
Atlantic yellow-nosed albatross, Thalassarche chlororhynchos 
Indian yellow-nosed albatross, Thalassarche carteri 
Buller's albatross, Thalassarche bulleri

Fulmars, petrels, prions and shearwaters
Order: ProcellariiformesFamily: Procellariidae

The procellariids are the main group of medium-sized "true petrels", characterized by united nostrils with medium nasal septum, and a long outer functional primary flight feather.

Southern giant petrel, Macronectes giganteus 
Northern giant petrel, Macronectes halli 

Northern fulmar, Fulmarus glacialis 
Southern fulmar, Fulmarus glacialoides 
Antarctic petrel, Thalassoica antarctica 

Cape petrel, Daption capense 
Snow petrel, Pagodroma nivea 
Blue petrel, Halobaena caerulea 

Broad-billed prion, Pachyptila vittata 
Salvin's prion, Pachyptila salvini 
Antarctic prion, Pachyptila desolata 
Slender-billed prion, Pachyptila belcheri 
Fairy prion, Pachyptila turtur 
Fulmar prion, Pachyptila crassirostris 

Kerguelen petrel, Lugensa brevirostris 
Great-winged petrel, Pterodroma macroptera 
White-headed petrel, Pterodroma lessonii 
Atlantic petrel, Pterodroma incerta 
Providence petrel, Pterodroma solandri 
Magenta petrel, Pterodroma magentae 
Murphy's petrel, Pterodroma ultima 
Soft-plumaged petrel, Pterodroma mollis 
Zino's petrel, Pterodroma madeira 
Fea's petrel, Pterodroma feae 
Desertas petrel, Pterodroma deserta 
Bermuda petrel, Pterodroma cahow 
Black-capped petrel, Pterodroma hasitata 
Jamaican petrel, Pterodroma caribbaea 
Juan Fernandez petrel, Pterodroma externa 
Vanuatu petrel, Pterodroma occulta
Kermadec petrel, Pterodroma neglecta 
Herald petrel, Pterodroma heraldica 
Trindade petrel, Pterodroma arminjoniana 
Henderson petrel, Pterodroma atrata 
Phoenix petrel, Pterodroma alba 
Barau's petrel, Pterodroma baraui 
Hawaiian petrel, Pterodroma sandwichensis 
Galapagos petrel, Pterodroma phaeopygia 
Mottled petrel, Pterodroma inexpectata 
White-necked petrel, Pterodroma cervicalis 
Black-winged petrel, Pterodroma nigripennis 
Chatham petrel, Pterodroma axillaris 
Bonin petrel, Pterodroma hypoleuca 
Gould's petrel, Pterodroma leucoptera 
Collared petrel, Pterodroma brevipes 
Cook's petrel, Pterodroma cookii 
Masatierra petrel, Pterodroma defilippiana 
Stejneger's petrel, Pterodroma longirostris 
Pycroft's petrel, Pterodroma pycrofti 
Mascarene petrel, Pseudobulweria aterrima 
Saint Helena petrel, Pseudobulweria rupinarum 

Tahiti petrel, Pseudobulweria rostrata 
Beck's petrel, Pseudobulweria becki 
Fiji petrel, Pseudobulweria macgillivrayi 
Grey petrel, Procellaria cinerea 
White-chinned petrel, Procellaria aequinoctialis 
Spectacled petrel, Procellaria conspicillata 
Black petrel, Procellaria parkinsoni 
Westland petrel, Procellaria westlandica 

Streaked shearwater, Calonectris leucomelas 
Scopoli's shearwater, Calonectris (diomedea) diomedea (C. diomedea including C. (d.) borealis and C. (d.) diomedea)
Cory's shearwater, Calonectris (diomedea) borealis (C. diomedea including C. (d.) borealis and C. (d.) diomedea)
Cape Verde shearwater, Calonectris edwardsii 
Wedge-tailed shearwater, Puffinus pacificus 
Buller's shearwater, Puffinus bulleri 
Sooty shearwater, Puffinus griseus 
Short-tailed shearwater, Puffinus tenuirostris 
Pink-footed shearwater, Puffinus creatopus 
Flesh-footed shearwater, Puffinus carneipes 
Great shearwater, Puffinus gravis 
Christmas shearwater, Puffinus nativitatis 
Manx shearwater, Puffinus puffinus 
Yelkouan shearwater, Puffinus yelkouan 
Balearic shearwater, Puffinus mauretanicus 
Bryan's shearwater, Puffinus bryani  
Black-vented shearwater, Puffinus opisthomelas 
Townsend's shearwater, Puffinus auricularis 
Newell's shearwater, Puffinus newelli 
Rapa shearwater, Puffinus myrtae 
Fluttering shearwater, Puffinus gavia 
Hutton's shearwater, Puffinus huttoni 
Audubon's shearwater, Puffinus lherminieri 
Persian shearwater, Puffinus persicus 
Tropical shearwater, Puffinus bailloni 
Galapagos shearwater, Puffinus subalaris 
Heinroth's shearwater, Puffinus heinrothi 
Little shearwater, Puffinus assimilis 
Boyd's shearwater, Puffinus boydi  (P. assimilis: ,)
Bulwer's petrel, Bulweria bulwerii 
Olson's petrel, Bulweria bifax 
Jouanin's petrel, Bulweria fallax

Storm petrels
Order: ProcellariiformesFamily: Hydrobatidae

The storm-petrels are the smallest seabirds, relatives of the petrels, feeding on planktonic crustaceans and small fish picked from the surface, typically while hovering. Their flight is fluttering and sometimes bat-like.

Wilson's storm petrel, Oceanites oceanicus 
Elliot's storm petrel, Oceanites gracilis 
Grey-backed storm petrel, Garrodia nereis 
White-faced storm petrel, Pelagodroma marina 
White-bellied storm petrel, Fregetta grallaria 
Black-bellied storm petrel, Fregetta tropica 
New Zealand storm petrel, Fregetta maorianus 
Polynesian storm petrel, Nesofregetta fuliginosa 
European storm petrel, Hydrobates pelagicus 
Least storm petrel, Hydrobates microsoma 
Wedge-rumped storm petrel, Hydrobates tethys 
Band-rumped storm petrel, Hydrobates castro 
Monteiro's storm petrel, Hydrobates monteiroi 
Cape Verde storm petrel, Hydrobates jabejabe 
Swinhoe's storm petrel, Hydrobates monorhis 
Leach's storm petrel, Hydrobates leucorhoa 
Markham's storm petrel, Hydrobates markhami 
Tristram's storm petrel, Hydrobates tristrami 
Black storm petrel, Hydrobates melania 
Guadalupe storm petrel, Hydrobates macrodactyla 
Matsudaira's storm petrel, Hydrobates matsudairae 
Ashy storm petrel, Hydrobates homochroa 
Ringed storm petrel, Hydrobates hornbyi 
Fork-tailed storm petrel, Hydrobates furcata

Diving petrels

Order: ProcellariiformesFamily: Pelecanoididae

The diving-petrels are relatives of the petrels distinguishable only by small differences in plumage and bill construction. They feed on plankton by pursuit diving.

Peruvian diving petrel, Pelecanoides garnotii 
Magellanic diving petrel, Pelecanoides magellani 
South Georgia diving petrel, Pelecanoides georgicus 
Common diving petrel, Pelecanoides urinatrix

References

Bibliography

Procellariiformes
procellariiformes, List of